World Idol (Germany: SuperStar Weltweit, Arab World: SuperStar El Alaam) is a one-off international version of the singing competition television show Pop Idol, featuring winners of the various national Idol shows around the world competing against each other.

Background
The performance show was broadcast on Christmas Day 2003, with the results show aired on New Year's Day 2004. It was produced in the United Kingdom at Fountain Studios in London, using the set from the recently completed second series of Pop Idol. After presenting the competitors, viewers from the 11 participating countries were allowed to vote by telephone, but not for the participant from their home country.

All participants sang in English except for Diana Karazon, who sang in Arabic.

British presenters Ant and Dec hosted the show on most English speaking countries, while local presenters hosted for their own country in the local language. Additionally, Canada’s CTV Network used Canadian Idol host Ben Mulroney (with the show on Fox, which used Ant and Dec as hosts, was not simulcast with the CTV feed, to prevent Canadians from calling the American toll-free number to vote for their idol, Ryan Malcolm). Victoria Beckham performed her UK No. 3 hit "Let Your Head Go" during the results interval.

The show was broadcast on 11 television broadcasters worldwide.

Broadcasters
Germany: RTL Television
United Kingdom: ITV
Norway: TV 2
United States: Fox
Canada: CTV
Australia: Network Ten
Belgium: vtm
Poland: Polsat
The Netherlands: RTL 4
Arab States: Future TV
South Africa: M-NET
Egypt: SET, MBC1 & I.Sat
Sudan & Eritrea: VTV

Results
The points were awarded in a similar fashion as the Eurovision Song Contest, i.e. each country awarded a number of points from 1 to 10 to each other country, using each number once. The results were:

Scoreboard
Each country's Idol automatically gained the maximum 12 points. Therefore, the most points an Idol could gain from another country was 10.

10 points
Below is a summary of all 10 (max) points in the final:

Judges
The judges of the competition were:

 Randall Abrahams (South Africa)
 Simon Cowell (representing United States, also judge on original UK show)
  (Belgium)
 Ian "Dicko" Dickson (Australia)
 Shona Fraser (Germany)
 Jan Fredrik Karlsen (Norway)
 Elias Rahbani (Lebanon)
  (Netherlands)
 Pete Waterman (United Kingdom)
 Zack Werner (Canada)
 Kuba Wojewódzki (Poland)

Reception
Simon Cowell, who judged American Idol as well as the original Pop Idol, was very critical of the format. He went as far as to say he hated it, in that it made the winners from the ten other Idol competitions into losers. Cowell also thought many of the judges were trying to copy his abrasive style. Television critics also panned the programme, particularly as the UK phone voting was profit-making, whereas tradition dictates that Christmas specials of such programmes donate profits to charity.

Ratings
In Canada, the special was watched by 1.9 million viewers. In Poland, World Idol was the highest-rated in its timeslot, 4.5 million viewers, and 28.6 share percent. In the United States, World Idol was the number-one show of the night among adults from 18–34 but drew a disappointing 6.5 million viewers overall. In Australia, it was the highest-rated show of the night, it had about 2.4 million viewers. In the Netherlands, it was the No. 1 rated show in its timeslot. In the UK, over 4 million tuned in, but the show was beaten by other popular programs that aired Christmas night.

See also
Idol series
Pop Idol
American Idol
Idols South Africa
Canadian Idol
Australian Idol
Idol (Norway)
International versions of Idol

References

External links

2003 British television series debuts
2004 British television series endings
CTV Television Network original programming
Fox Broadcasting Company original programming
Idols (franchise)
ITV (TV network) original programming
Network 10 original programming
RTL (German TV channel) original programming
TV 2 (Norway) original programming
Television series by Fremantle (company)